During the latter stages of World War II, Pforzheim, a town in southwestern Germany, was bombed several times. The largest raid, one of the most devastating area bombardments of the war, was carried out by the Royal Air Force (RAF) on the evening of February 23, 1945. Some 17,600 people, or 31.4% of the town's population, were killed. About 83% of the town's buildings were destroyed, two-thirds of the complete area of Pforzheim and between 80% and 100% of the inner city.

Minor raids
The first Allied air raid on Pforzheim took place on April 1, 1944 when an attack by United States Army Air Forces (USAAF) bombers caused comparatively minor damage and killed 95 people. Further attacks by the USAAF followed, the largest on 24 December. Another on 21 January 1945 caused 56 casualties.

The RAF also carried out several nighttime nuisance raids on Pforzheim and other towns with de Havilland Mosquito light bombers. The raids, consisting of around six Mosquitos, forced the Luftwaffe to respond. They also helped confuse the defences, diverting resources away from the main bomber streams. These nuisance raids drove civilians into shelters and disturbed their sleep. Three consecutive raids occurred on the nights of October 2, 3 and 4, 1944 with a further three raids in October and one in November 1944. The RAF lost one aircraft in these raids.

After the devastating air raid of February 23, 1945, there were smaller air raids on Pforzheim. On March 4, USAAF B-24 Liberator aircraft bombed the area around "Kupferhammer". On March 14, 16, 18th, 19th, 20th and 24th, the railway facilities were bombed. On March 17, the motorway at Pforzheim was bombed, and on March 23 the area in Eutingen Valley was bombed.

Reasons for the main raid
A report compiled for RAF Bomber Command dated 28 June 1944, stated that Pforzheim was "one of the centres of the German jewellery and watch making trade and is therefore likely to have become of considerable importance to the production of precision instruments [of use in the war effort]." An Allied report issued in August 1944 stated that "almost every house in this town centre is a small workshop" and that there were a few larger factories in the south and one in the north of the city centre. An attack on the city would destroy the "built-up area, the associated industries and rail facilities". There were no war-crucial targets; only war-relevant ones.

In November 1944, Pforzheim was placed for the first time on a target list of the Allied Forces, but with the lowest priority of category five. In that report, the city was described as being suitable for a raid, because the road and rail communications through the easily spotted old city was known to be flammable. Pforzheim was used in the transfer of troops.

Main raid

The large raid that almost destroyed the inner city district occurred on the evening of February 23, 1945. The first bombs were dropped at 19:50 and the last one at 20:12. The attack on "Yellowfin", the RAF's code name for Pforzheim, included 379 aircraft.

The main force bombers were 367 Avro Lancasters of No. 1, No. 6, and No. 8 Groups along with one Film Unit Lancaster, and 13 Mosquitos of No. 8 Group (the Pathfinders). The master bomber for the raid was Major Ted Swales, DFC, a South African, aged 29, who would be awarded Bomber Command's last Victoria Cross of the war for his actions on this night. Despite severe damage to his plane he remained over the target directing the raid and died when his Lancaster crashed near Valenciennes on the return flight.

The bomber stream attacked from a height of 8,000 feet (2,400 m). The bombs were a, by now, standard mix of high explosive and incendiary bombs. The town centre suffered immediate destruction and a firestorm broke out, reaching its most devastating phase about 10 minutes from the start of the raid. The smoke over the town rose to about 3,000 metres, and the returning bomber crews could still see the glare of the fire up to 160 km away.

Twelve aircraft of the bomber fleet did not return to their bases. Eleven of them were shot down by Luftwaffe fighters stationed at Großsachsenheim (now Sachsenheim), and another was assumed to have been accidentally hit by "friendly" bombs. At least two aircraft crashed not far from Pforzheim, and Swales' aircraft, which had been hit twice, crashed in France. One of the Lancasters that crashed near Pforzheim went down close to the village of Neuhausen (Enzkreis). Three of its crew members bailed out, of whom two survived; the remaining crew members died. The other one crashed near the village of Althengstett near the town of Calw.

Impact of the attack
The German Army Report of February 24, 1945 devoted only two lines to reporting the bombardment: "In the early evening hours of February 23, a forceful British attack was directed at Pforzheim". The post-war British Bombing Survey Unit estimated that 83 per cent of the town's built-up area was destroyed, "probably the greatest proportion in one raid during the war". In the centre, almost 90% of the buildings were destroyed.

In an area about 3 km long and 1.5 km wide, all buildings were reduced to rubble. 17,600 citizens were officially counted as dead and thousands were injured. People died from the immediate impact of explosions, from burns due to burning incendiary materials that seeped through basement windows into the cellars of houses where they hid, from poisonous gases, lack of oxygen, and collapsing walls of houses. Some of them drowned in the Enz or Nagold rivers into which they had jumped while trying to escape from the burning incendiary materials in the streets, but even the rivers were burning as the phosphorus floated on the water.

After the attack, about 30,000 people had to be fed by makeshift public kitchens because their housing had been destroyed. Many Pforzheim citizens were buried in common graves at Pforzheim's main cemetery because they could not be identified. There are many graves of complete families. The labour office of 1942 listed 2,980 foreigners in Pforzheim, and one source puts the number of foreign laborers who died in the bombings at 498 (among them 50 Italians).

The inner city districts were almost totally depopulated. According to the State Statistics Bureau (Statistisches Landesamt), in the Market Square area (Marktplatzviertel) in 1939 there were 4,112 registered inhabitants, in 1945 none. In the Old Town area (Altstadtviertel) in 1939 there were 5,109 inhabitants, in 1945 only 2 persons were still living there. In the Leopold Square area, in 1939 there were 4,416 inhabitants, in 1945 only 13.

Some surviving Allied aircrew were killed after they fell into the hands of German civilians. Four weeks after the Pforzheim main raid, the British crew of a Avro Lancaster bailed out near Pforzheim where they were captured, and six of them were shot at the nearby village of Huchenfeld. One member managed to escape but was later recaptured and taken to a POW camp.

Post war
Rather than rebuild the centre of Pforzheim on the old street plan, the main thoroughfares were widened after the war. The rubble from the destruction was heaped into a large, high mound on the outskirts of the town and covered with soil and vegetation. It is officially named the "Wallberg". As with other German cities which have similar mounds, it remains a visible reminder of the destruction brought upon the city during World War II.

Notes

  Christian Groh Pforzheim and References Pforzheimer Zeitung of February 9, 2005.
  Pforzheimer Zeitung of March 4, 2005.

  Groh
  Groh
 Detlef Siebert British Bombing Strategy in World War Two Page 4 BBC 1 August 2001

  Yellowfin from Groh, other information from RAF Web Site: Campaign Diary February 1945.
  The tonnage of bombs and the height of the raid can be found in the Reference RAF Web Site: Campaign Diary February 1945.
  The number of bombs, the height of smoke and the visibility of the fire is reported in References Pforzheimer Zeitung of February 23, 2005.
  The RAF gives the number of bombers lost for all raids that night, but not the specifics for this raid. But the figures are in line with total RAF losses. The number of 12 aircraft lost is reported in Pforzheimer Zeitung of February 23, 2005, under headline "Stadt gleicht Feuermeer" which was written by the author of Pforzheim. Codename Yellowfin, Eine Analyse der Luftangriffe 1944 - 45, Ursula Moessner-Heckner. Mrs. Moessner-Heckner is a historian who was trained at San Jose State University and Berkeley in the United States of America and who also taught at San Jose State University. She has conducted extensive research on this subject in archives in Washington D.C., Stanford, London and elsewhere and has actually interviewed RAF crew members who participated in the Pforzheim air raid. She was born in Pforzheim in 1935 and grew up there. (see References Pforzheimer Zeitung of February 23, 2005, under headline "Ursula Moessner-Heckner").
  Grosssachsenheim as the Luftwaffe base is reported in Pforzheimer Zeitung of February 23, 2005.
  Crash reported in Pforzheimer Zeitung of February 12, 2005.
  Crash reported in Pforzheimer Zeitung of February 28, 2005.

  References 83% RAF Web Site: Campaign Diary February 1945, The German army report is taken from References Pforzheimer Zeitung of February 23, 2005, under headline "Sofortmeldung nach dem Angriff". Its original in German reads: "In den fruehen Abendstunden richtete sich ein schwerer britischer Angriff gegen Pforzheim".
  The number of dead 17,600 is taken from Groh. The rest of the paragraph is from the series of articles in Pforzheimer Zeitung pointed to at the bottom of the References, including References Pforzheimer Zeitung of Febr. 4, Febr. 11, Febr. 17, 2005.
  The 30,000 people fed by makeshift kitchens is reported in References Pforzheimer Zeitung of February 25, 2005.
  The Foreign labour taken from References Groh.
  The number of foreign workers who died in the bombings is reported in References Pforzheimer Zeitung of February 10, 2005.
  These figures are similar to References Groh, but must be from another source which is not recorded.

  The information about Pforzheim from References Groh. The name of the "Wallberg" can be found on any decent map of Pforzheim, including the one at the official internet site of the City of Pforzheim (Citymap of Pforzheim), where the Wallberg is indicated under this name with a height of 417.5 meters above sea level.

References
 Campaign Diary 1944 Bomber Command 60th Anniversary website
 Campaign Diary February 1945 Bomber Command 60th Anniversary website
 Pforzheim - 23 February 1945 by Christian Groh, in: historicum.net dated 24.4.2005. In German.
 Report of magazine 'Stern' In German.
 Documentation about the raid on Pforzheim In German and partly in English
 Pforzheimer Zeitung of February 4, 2005, No.28, p. 22 (in German)
 Pforzheimer Zeitung of February 9, 2005, No.32, p. 18 (in German)
 Pforzheimer Zeitung of February 10, 2005, No.33, p. 18 (in German)
 Pforzheimer Zeitung of February 11, 2005, No.34, p. 20 (in German)
 Pforzheimer Zeitung of February 12, 2005, No.35, p. 25 (in German)
 Pforzheimer Zeitung of February 17, 2005, No.39, p. 18 (in German)
 Pforzheimer Zeitung of February 23, 2005, No.44, p. 22 (in German)
 Pforzheimer Zeitung of February 25, 2005, No.46, p. 24 (in German)
 Pforzheimer Zeitung of February 28, 2005, No.48, p. 28 (in German)
 Pforzheimer Zeitung of March 4, 2005, No.52, p. 20 (in German)
(Note: The series of Pforzheimer Zeitung articles can be found at "Pforzheimer Zeitung online archive" under "23. February 1945")
 Ursula Moessner-Heckner: Pforzheim. Code Yellowfin. Eine Analyse der Luftangriffe 1944 - 45, Thorbecke, Sigmaringen, Germany;  ; (October 1997)
 Movie "Code Yellowfin", documentary, Germany 2005, directed by Peter Müller-Buchow

Conflicts in 1945
Firebombings
Germany–United Kingdom military relations
1945 in Germany
Pforzheim
World War II strategic bombing of Germany